Daniel Wells, Jr., (July 16, 1808March 18, 1902) was an American railroad businessman, Democratic politician, and Wisconsin pioneer.  He served two terms in the U.S. House of Representatives (1853–1857), representing Wisconsin.

Biography

Born in West Waterville, Massachusetts (now Oakland, Maine), Wells attended the public schools and became a teacher.  Wells engaged in the mercantile business at Palmyra, Maine. He then moved to Milwaukee, Wisconsin, in 1838 and engaged in banking and lumbering pursuits. He was appointed probate judge of Milwaukee in 1838. He served as member of the Wisconsin Territorial Council 1838-1840.

Wells was elected as a Democrat to the Thirty-third and Thirty-fourth Congresses (March 4, 1853 – March 3, 1857). He represented Wisconsin's 1st congressional district.
He served as chairman of the Committee on Expenditures in the Department of State (Thirty-third Congress). Wells was not a candidate for renomination in 1856.

He engaged in the development of railroads serving as: a director of the Chicago, Milwaukee & St. Paul Railroad in 1865 and 1866 and president of the La Crosse & Milwaukee Railroad, the Southern Minnesota Railroad, and the St. Paul & Minnesota Valley Railroad.
Wells died in Milwaukee, Wisconsin, March 18, 1902 and was interred in Forest Home Cemetery.

References

External links

 

1808 births
1902 deaths
People from Oakland, Maine
Politicians from Milwaukee
Members of the Wisconsin Territorial Legislature
Businesspeople from Maine
Businesspeople from Milwaukee
Democratic Party members of the United States House of Representatives from Wisconsin
19th-century American politicians
People from Palmyra, Maine
19th-century American businesspeople